Echeta minerva is a moth of the family Erebidae. It was described by William Schaus in 1915. It is found in Brazil.

References

Phaegopterina
Moths described in 1915